Daniel Tapeta (born 25 October 1974, in Tahiti) is a footballer who plays as a goalkeeper. He currently plays for AS Manu-Ura in the Tahiti Division Fédérale and the Tahiti national football team.

References

1974 births
Living people
French Polynesian footballers
Tahiti international footballers
1998 OFC Nations Cup players
2000 OFC Nations Cup players
2002 OFC Nations Cup players
2004 OFC Nations Cup players
Association football goalkeepers